The Cebu City Hall is the official seat of government of the City of Cebu, located in Barangay Santo Niño, Cebu City, Philippines. Composed of two buildings namely the Executive Building and the Legislative Building, it is where the Mayor of Cebu City holds office and houses the Cebu City Council. It also hosts several offices under the Cebu City Government.

In 2006, the city government spent  to renovate its legislative building, where  came from the Philippine Tourism Authority, and was officially inaugurated by President Gloria Macapagal Arroyo on July 24, 2008 along with the new Plaza Sugbo.

With the aim to decongest traffic in the city's downtown area, then mayor Michael Rama proposed in 2015 the transfer of the Cebu City Hall to the South Road Properties and convert the said building into a museum as it was close to significant historical landmarks of the city such as the Basilica del Santo Niño, Magellan's Cross, Cebu Metropolitan Cathedral, Fort San Pedro, Plaza Independencia, and Cathedral Museum of Cebu, among others. He was taking a page on constructing a government complex from Putrajaya which is Malaysia's seat of government.

References

External links 
City Government of Cebu

Buildings and structures in Cebu City
City and municipal halls in the Philippines
Local government in Cebu City